The Cape Cod International Film Festival (CCIFF) is an annual showcase of short and feature films that takes place at the Orpheum Theater in Chatham, Massachusetts, and the Main Street Wine and Gourmet screening loft in Orleans, Massachusetts.  Films are submitted from around the world. Official selections are made in August and the festival takes place in October.

History
The CCIFF was founded in 2014 by Cape Cod resident, Phil Rectra.  The inaugural event took place October 10–18, 2015 and featured 26 films curated from 330 submissions. The majority of films were submitted via FilmFreeway and Withoutabox online platforms. 

One of the 2015 CCIFF Official Selections, We Can't Live Without Cosmos, written and directed by Konstantin Bronzit, was nominated for a 2016 Academy Award for Best Animated Short Film.

Official Selections

2015
 The Nike Chariot Earring (USA), Karen Audette, Director
 SLØR (Denmark), Charlotte Schioler, Director
 Doeville (USA), Kathryn Pasternak, Director
 JIÀOLIÀN [COACH] (China/USA), Esteban Arguello, Director
 Barrow (Australia), Wade K. Savage, Director; Peter Gurbriel, Producer
 The Loneliest (USA), Lilian Mehrel, Director
 PONY (USA), Candice Carella, Director
 Dispose of Us (Germany), Florian Kelm, Director
 Sol (Russia), Abraham Polinsky
 If the Trees Could Talk (USA), Michael Weinstein, Director
 Zio Ninuccio (Italy), Noriko Sigiura, Director
 Indigo Grey (USA), Sean Robinson, Director
 Discipline (Switzerland), Christophe Saber, Director
 The Cobblestone Corridor (USA), Erik Bloomquist, Director
 Eye of the Storm (USA), S. Kramer Herzog, Director
 The Hatch House (USA), Bara Jichova, Director
 Shabu-Shabu Spirit (Japan), Yuki Saito, Director
 Sci-Tech Band: Pride of Springfield (USA), Lawrence Hott, Director
 M. Steinert & Sons (USA), Mike Mallen, Director
 The Unclean (Iran), Bahram Ark & Bahman Ark, Directors
 Eadweard (Canada)
 We Can't Live Without Cosmos (Russia), Konstantine Bronzit, Director
 Colors of Life (Japan), Goro Ushijima, Director
 The Red Thunder (USA), Alvaro Ron, Director
 Chapa [The Grill Man] (Brazil), Diana Golts, Producer
 Aurora (USA), Nicole LaCroix, Director

Awards
 Best Picture:  2015 - Eadweard (Canada)
 Best Director: 2015 - Charlotte Schioler, SLØR (Denmark)
 Best Performance by a Male Actor: 2015 - Xander Berkeley, PONY (USA)
 Best Performance by a Female Actor: 2015 - Amanda Woodhams, Barrow (Australia)
 Best Live Action Short: 2015 - Chapa [The Grill Man] (Brazil)
 Best Animated Short: 2015 - We Can't Live Without Cosmos (Russia)
 Best Documentary Short: 2015 - The Nike Chariot Earring (USA)
 Best Documentary Feature: 2015 - Jiàoliàn [Coach] (China)
 Audience Choice Award: 2015 - Sci-Tech Band: The Pride of Springfield (USA)

References

External links
 Official Website

Film festivals in Massachusetts